Lieutenant-General Viktor Vladimirovich Golovanov (Виктор Владимирович Голованов; born May 2, 1959 in Moscow, Russia) is a Russian policeman who was the acting Moscow Police Commissioner (May–June 2012), after the previous chief Vladimir Kolokoltsev was appointed as the Federal Minister for Internal Affairs.

Biography
Golovanov was born on May 2, 1959 in Moscow. He is in police service from 1980 and started his career from the position of policeman in police station no. 125 of Moscow. He has been on positions from 1990:

 From 1996 until 2000, he was on the position of the deputy chief of Criminal Police – the chief of Criminal Investigation Department of Moscow Police;
 In 2000, he was dismissed from police. From 2000 until 2003 he temporarily did not work;
 In 2003, he was appointed to the position of the chief of Criminal Investigation Department of Moscow Police;
 In 2011 he was appointed by the Presidential Decree to the position of the deputy chief of Moscow Police Department. 
 Between May and June 2012, he was appointed by Interior Minister as the acting Moscow Police Commissioner

Personal life
During his police service Golovanov was decorated with many awards.

External links 
 biography

References

1959 births
Commissioners of the Moscow City Police
Living people
Recipients of the Order of Honour (Russia)
Russian municipal police chiefs